Warrick Wayne Gelant (born 20 May 1995) is a South African professional rugby union player who currently plays for the South Africa national team and  in the Top 14. His regular position is fullback, He was a member of the winning Springboks at the 2019 Rugby World Cup in Japan.

Career

2008–13

Gelant came to the attention of provincial selectors as early as primary school level, when he was selected to represent SWD at the Under-13 Craven Week tournament in 2008. He continued his progression by being selected for the Under-16 side that played at the 2011 Grant Khomo Week competition. Even though he was in the Under-17 age group, he represented SWD at the 2012 Under-18 Craven Week competition and his performances there also ensured he was selected in the 2012 South African Schools team. He represented them in matches against France, Wales and England, playing as both a fullback and a centre. He missed out on Craven Week selection in 2013 when he picked up an injury shortly before the tournament, but this did not prevent him for again being selected for the South African Schools side. He once again appeared in all three of their matches, held against the same opposition: England, France and Wales.

2014

He was included in their squad for the 2014 Vodacom Cup, but failed to be involved in that competition. Instead, he played some rugby for university side  in the 2014 Varsity Cup competition, starting all seven of their matches in the competition.

Gelant was then included in the South Africa Under-20 squad that participated in the 2014 IRB Junior World Championship held in New Zealand. He started their opening match against Scotland, scoring a second-half try to help South Africa to a 61–5 victory Four days later, he started another match for the Under-20s in a 33–24 victory against hosts and four-time winners New Zealand, with Gelant once again scoring one of South Africa's tries. He played off the bench for their final pool match, a 21–8 victory over Samoa as South Africa finished top of the group to set up a rematch with New Zealand in the semi-finals. Gelant started the semi-final and helped South Africa secure their fourth consecutive victory over New Zealand at this level, winning 32–25. He made his fifth appearance – and fourth start – of the tournament in the final, but could not prevent South Africa finishing on the losing side this time, with England winning the championship for the second consecutive year with a 21–20 victory over South Africa.

Gelant returned to domestic action after the Junior World Championship, making five appearances for the s during the 2014 Under-19 Provincial Championship, scoring a try in the final of the competition against , which wasn't enough to prevent his side suffering a 26–33 loss in Cape Town.

2014–

At the end of 2014, Gelant was called up to the South African Sevens side for their 2014–15 Sevens World Series campaign. He had a memorable start to his sevens career South Africa winning both of the first two tournaments that he played in – the 2014 Dubai Sevens and the 2014 South Africa Sevens.

Gelant was also included in the ' squad for the 2015 Super Rugby season, although his sevens commitments ruled him out of the start of the campaign.

In March 2015, Gelant was named in an extended South Africa Under-20 training group as part of their preparation for the 2015 World Rugby Under 20 Championship. He featured for them in a friendly match against a Varsity Cup Dream Team in April 2015. He was also included in the South Africa Under-20 squad that toured Argentina in May 2015, making an appearance off the bench in the first match.

Upon the team's return, Gelant was named in the final squad for the 2015 World Rugby Under 20 Championship. He started all three of their matches in Pool B of the competition; a 33–5 win against hosts Italy, a 40–8 win against Samoa and a 46–13 win over Australia to help South Africa finish top of Pool B to qualify for the semi-finals with the best record pool stage of all the teams in the competition. Gelant started their semi-final match against England, but could not prevent them losing 20–28 to be eliminated from the competition by England for the second year in succession and also started their third-place play-off match against France, helping South Africa to a 31–18 win to secure third place in the competition.

Gelant was named in South Africa's squad for the 2019 Rugby World Cup. South Africa went on to win the tournament, defeating England in the final.

References

External links 
 

South African rugby union players
Living people
1995 births
People from Knysna
Rugby union centres
Rugby union fullbacks
Blue Bulls players
Bulls (rugby union) players
South Africa international rugby sevens players
South Africa Under-20 international rugby union players
Cape Coloureds
South Africa international rugby union players
Stormers players
Western Province (rugby union) players
Rugby union players from the Western Cape
Racing 92 players